Julia Ember is an author of young adult fantasy fiction, best known for her Young Adult retellings of classic works.

Works 

Ember's first novel, The Seafarer's Kiss, first in the Seafarer Duology, is a Norse retelling of The Little Mermaid, about a rebellious bisexual mermaid Ersel who falls for the shieldmaiden Ragna and makes a deal with the trickster god Loki to escape her fate as the bride of a merman she doesn't love. It was published in 2017 by Duet Books. The Seafarer's Kiss was a finalist for the 2017 Bisexual Book Award in the category Speculative Fiction. The companion novel, The Navigator's Touch, is a Norse retelling of Peter Pan and tells the story of the shieldmaiden Ragna, who is on a quest to avenger her destroyed home, with the help of a motley group of mercenaries and her mermaid girlfriend Ersel. It was published in 2018 by Duet Books.

Ember's next novel, Ruinsong, a fantasy retelling of the Phantom of the Opera, about a girl with a magic voice who is forced to use it to serve the queen, was published by Farrar, Straus & Giroux in November 2020.

Ember is also the author of several novellas and short stories. Unicorn Tracks, was published in 2016 by Harmony Ink Press. In the Tanzanian-inspired novella, a safari guide who tracks mythical creatures is employed by a researcher and his daughter to track unicorns, only to stumble upon a group of poachers they aim to stop from killing more unicorns.

Her second novella, The Tiger's Watch, is about a genderfluid spy with a magical bond to a tiger who seeks refuge in a monastery when their homeland gets invaded. It was published in 2017 by Harmony Ink Press.

Bibliography 
Novels

Seafarer Duology

 The Seafarer's Kiss (Duet Books, 2017)
 The Navigator's Touch (Duet Books, 2018)

Ruinsong (Farrar, Straus & Giroux, 2020)

Novellas

 Unicorn Tracks (Harmony Ink Press, 2016)
 The Tiger's Watch (Harmony Ink Press, 2017)

Short stories

 "The Herbalist" (The Hanging Garden, 2018)

Awards 
Nominations

2017

Bisexual Book Award finalist in the category Speculative Fiction for The Seafarer's Kiss (Duet Books, 2017)

References 

Living people
21st-century American novelists
American LGBT writers
American women novelists
21st-century American women writers
Year of birth missing (living people)